Max Allan Collins (born March 3, 1948) is an American mystery writer, noted for his graphic novels. His work has been published in several formats and his Road to Perdition series was the basis for a film of the same name. He wrote the Dick Tracy newspaper strip for many years and has produced numerous novels featuring the character as well.

Biography

Writing career
Collins has written novels, screenplays, comic books, comic strips, trading cards, short stories, movie novelizations and historical fiction. He wrote the graphic novel Road to Perdition (which was developed into a film in 2002), created the comic book private eye Ms. Tree, and took over writing the Dick Tracy comic strip from creator Chester Gould. Collins briefly wrote the Batman comic book in 1987 and crafted a new origin for the Jason Todd character. Collins and artist Terry Beatty created Wild Dog at DC that same year in a self-titled limited series. The character later appeared as a feature in the Action Comics Weekly anthology. As of 2016, Wild Dog became a recurring character in the Arrow television series and is portrayed by actor Rick Gonzalez.

Another Collins contribution to the Batman franchise was scripting the English-language translation of Batman: Child of Dreams in 2003. He wrote books to expand on the Dark Angel TV series. He has written books and comics based on the TV series franchise CSI. In 2006 he wrote Buried Deep (also released as "Bones Buried Deep"), based on the TV series Bones.

He has written two sequel novels to Road to Perdition: Road to Purgatory and Road to Paradise. He wrote three more graphic novels starring the characters from Road to Perdition. These graphic novels, called collectively On the Road to Perdition, form the basis of the film.

He co-founded the International Association of Media Tie-in Writers with Lee Goldberg. The IAMTW is an organization for writers of tie-ins and novelizations.

Collins studied in the Iowa Writers' Workshop at the University of Iowa.

Collins is a fan of the mystery writer Mickey Spillane from childhood and later became close friends with him. The two collaborated on a comic book series in the 1990s called Mike Danger. Upon Spillane's death in 2006, Collins was entrusted to finish various uncompleted works by Spillane including Dead Street, The Big Showdown, and an ongoing series of Mike Hammer novel completions, beginning with The Goliath Bone in 2008. To date, Collins has completed thirteen Spillane Hammer novels, with the most recent being Kill Me If You Can, published in 2022.

In 2021, he and Canadian actor/writer Dave Thomas teamed to write the sci-fi mystery novel The Many Lives of Jimmy Leighton.

Movies and music
In addition to his work as a writer, Collins has written and directed four movies: Mommy, Mommy 2: Mommy's Day, Real Time: Siege at Lucas Street Market, and Eliot Ness: An Untouchable Life (based on his Edgar Award–nominated play). All four were produced independently on location in Collins' hometown of Muscatine, Iowa. The first three are available on DVD — separately or in the Black Box set — from Troma Team Video, and the Ness film is distributed by VCI Entertainment. The DVD release of 'Real Time: Siege at Lucas Street Market' being notable for being one of the first films to take advantage of the multi-angle feature on DVD players, thus giving viewers the opportunity to watch the story unfold from different viewpoints.

Collins has written and performed music with his rock band, Crusin'.

Political views
Collins is a Democrat, describing his political views thus: "I think of myself as slightly left of center, but my father thought of himself as slightly right of center, when he was slightly right of Genghis Khan. So who knows? I do know that I veer left when the right is getting out of hand, which they frequently do."

Personal life
Collins and his wife, Barbara, have a son, Nathan.

In 2008, the band he started in 1966 in Muscatine, Iowa - The Daybreakers - was inducted into the Iowa Rock ‘n’ Roll Hall of Fame.   Ten years later - in 2018 - Collins was again inducted into the Iowa Rock ‘n’ Roll Hall of Fame as a member of the band, Cruisin’.

Awards
Collins received an Inkpot Award in 1982. He won the Shamus Award in 1984 and 1992.

Selected bibliography

Quarry series
This series features a former U.S. Marine sniper turned professional assassin after returning from the Vietnam War in 1973.

Quarry (a.k.a. The Broker) (1976)
Quarry's List (a.k.a. The Broker's Wife) (1976)
Quarry's Deal (a.k.a. The Dealer) (1976)
Quarry's Cut (a.k.a. The Slasher) (1977)
Quarry's Vote (a.k.a. Primary Target) (1987)
Quarry's Greatest Hits (contains 'Primary Target' and a short story) (2003)
The Last Quarry (2006)
The First Quarry (2008)
Quarry In The Middle (2009)
Quarry's Ex (2010)
The Wrong Quarry (2014)
Quarry's Choice (2015)
Quarry In The Black (2016)
Quarry's Climax (2017)
Killing Quarry (2019)
Quarry's Blood (2022)

Cinemax has created a TV adaptation of Quarry. Written by Michael D. Fuller and Graham Gordy based loosely on the book series, the project centers on a Marine marksman who, upon returning home from Vietnam in 1972, finds himself shunned by those he loves and demonized by the public. The disillusioned vet is quickly recruited into a network of contract killers and corruption spanning the Mississippi River. The show was cancelled in May 2017.

Nolan series
This series features a professional thief, similar to and apparently inspired by Richard Stark's "Parker" character, who operates in the Midwest.

Bait Money (1981)
Blood Money (1981)
Fly Paper (1981)
Hush Money (1981)
Hard Cash (1981)
Scratch Fever (1982)
Spree (1987)
Mourn the Living (1999) Collins's first written novel, but not published until 1999)
Two for the Money (omnibus reprint of the first two books Bait Money and Blood Money) (2004)
Skim Deep (2020)
Double Down (omnibus reprint of the third and fourth books Fly Paper and Hush Money) (2021)
Tough Tender (omnibus reprint of the fifth and sixth books Hard Cash and Scratch Fever) (2022)
Mad Money (omnibus reprint of the seventh and eighth books Spree and Mourn the Living) (2023)

Mallory series
The Mallory series is about a mystery writer in Iowa who solves crimes.

The Baby Blue Rip-Off (1983)
No Cure for Death (1983)
Kill Your Darlings (1984)
A Shroud for Aquarius (1985)
Nice Weekend for a Murder (1986)

Nathan Heller series
Collins' longest running series and arguably his best known work is his Nathan Heller series. Heller is a Chicago private investigator who gets involved in famous crimes and meets famous people of the 1930s and 1940s, including Orson Welles, Frank Nitti, and Sally Rand. The first novel in this historical fiction series, True Detective, won the 1984 Shamus Award for Best P.I. Hardcover from the Private Eye Writers of America. Collins won his second Shamus in 1992 for the Heller novel Stolen Away, an account of the Lindbergh kidnapping. His 1999 novel Flying Blind sees Heller investigate the disappearance of Amelia Earhart, along the way becoming romantically involved with her. With the release of Chicago Confidential, Collins moved the action into the 1950s. Target Lancer, about an alleged attempt to assassinate John F. Kennedy in Chicago just weeks before the actual assassination in Dallas, was published in November 2012.
True Detective (November 1983)
True Crime (December 1984)
The Million-Dollar Wound (February 1986)
Neon Mirage (February 1988)
Stolen Away (May 1991)
Dying in the Post-War World (October 1991) – Novella
Carnal Hours (April 1994) (about Harry Oakes' murder)
Blood and Thunder (August 1995) (about Huey Long's assassination)
Damned in Paradise (October 1996)
Flying Blind (August 1998)
Majic Man (September 1999)
Angel in Black (March 2001)
Kisses of Death: A Nathan Heller Casebook (Crippen & Landru, June 2001) – Short story collection
Chicago Confidential (June 2002)
Bye Bye, Baby (August 2011)
Chicago Lightning: The Collected Nathan Heller Short Stories (October 2011)
Triple Play: A Nathan Heller Casebook (April 2012) – Includes "Dying in the Post-War World", "Kisses of Death", and "Strike Zone"
Target Lancer (November 2012)
Ask Not (2013)
Better Dead (2016)
Do No Harm (2020)
The Big Bundle (January 2023)

Eliot Ness series
This series of novels is about real life Untouchable Eliot Ness's career as Director of Public Safety in Cleveland.

The Dark City (1987)
Butcher's Dozen (1988)
Bullet Proof (1989)
Murder by the Numbers (1993)
An Eliot Ness Mystery Omnibus (2020) - contains all four novels in one volume

Dick Tracy series

Dick Tracy (May 1990), film novelization
Dick Tracy: The Secret Files (June 1990), Editor (with Martin H. Greenberg), also contains short story Not a Creature Was Stirring
Dick Tracy and the Nightmare Machine with Dick Locher (January 1991) – comic strip collection
Dick Tracy Goes to War (February 1991) – novel
Dick Tracy Meets His Match (February 1992) – novel
Dick Tracy: The Collins Casefiles Volume 1 (October 2003) – comic strip collection
Dick Tracy: The Collins Casefiles Volume 2 (October 2004) – comic strip collection
Dick Tracy: The Collins Casefiles Volume 3 (January 2005)- comic strip collection

Novelizations
In the Line of Fire (1993)
Maverick (1994)
I Love Trouble (1994)
Waterworld (1995)
Air Force One (1997)
U.S. Marshals (1998)
Saving Private Ryan (August, 1998)
The Mummy (May 1999)
U-571 (2000)
The Mummy Returns (2001)
The Scorpion King (2002)
Windtalkers (April, 2002)
I-Spy (October 2002)
The Pink Panther (July 2005)
American Gangster (2007)
The Mummy: Tomb of the Dragon Emperor (July 2008)
The X-Files: I Want to Believe (July 2008)
G.I. Joe: The Rise of Cobra (2009)
G.I. Joe: Above and Beyond (2009)

Road to Perdition series

(*) Note: Road to Perdition: On the Road, is a single-volume collection of On the Road to Perdition Books 1–3.

Disaster series
The Titanic Murders (April 1999)
The Hindenburg Murders (June 2000)
The Pearl Harbor Murders (May 2001)
The Lusitania Murders (November 2002)
The London Blitz Murders (May 2004)
The War of the Worlds Murder (July 2005)

CSI: Crime Scene Investigation novels

Note: Mortal Wounds, is a trade paperback omnibus which collects Double Dealer, Sin City, and Cold Burn into a single volume.

CSI: Miami novels

Criminal Minds novels

Jack & Maggie Starr series
A mystery series set in and around the American comic book industry during the tail end of the Golden Age of Comic Books
A Killing in Comics (May 2007) – A murder mystery set around a fictionalized version of the Superman ownership dispute
Strip for Murder (May 2008) – A fictionalized version of the Al Capp/Ham Fisher feud and Fisher's suicide
Seduction of the Innocent (June 2013) – A murder mystery set around a fictionalized version of Frederic Wertham's crusade against comic books

J.C. Harrow Series
You Can't Stop Me (2010)
No One Will Hear You(2011)

Other television novels
NYPD Blue: Blue Beginning (1995)
NYPD Blue: Blue Blood (1997)
Dark Angel: Before the Dawn (2002)
Dark Angel: Skin Game (2003)
Dark Angel: After the Dark (2003)
Bones: Buried Deep (2006)

With Mickey Spillane

Dead Street (2007)
The Goliath Bone (2008) - Mike Hammer
The Big Switch - (2009) - Mike Hammer short story
The Big Bang (2010) - Mike Hammer
A Long Time Dead (2010) - Mike Hammer short story
Grave Matter (2010) - Mike Hammer short story in Crimes By Moonlight
Kiss Her Goodbye (2011) - Mike Hammer
The Consummata (2011)
Lady, Go Die! (2012) - Mike Hammer
Skin (2012) - Mike Hammer e-book short story
Complex 90 (2013) - Mike Hammer
So Long, Chief (2013) - Mike Hammer short story
King of the Weeds (2014) - Mike Hammer
It's in the Book (2014) - Mike Hammer e-book short story
Kill Me, Darling (2015) - Mike Hammer
Fallout (2015) - Mike Hammer short story
The Legend of Caleb York (2015)
Murder Never Knocks (2016) - Mike Hammer
A Dangerous Cat (2016) - Mike Hammer short story
The Big Showdown (2016) - A Caleb York story
A Long Time Dead: A Mike Hammer Casebook (2016) - reprints Mike Hammer short stories and e-book short stories
The Will To Kill (2017) - Mike Hammer
The Bloody Spur (2018) - A Caleb York story
Killing Town (2018) - Mike Hammer
Murder, My Love (2019) - Mike Hammer
The Last Stage to Hell Junction (2019) - A Caleb York story
Hot Lead, Cold Justice (2020) - A Caleb York story
Masquerade for Murder (2020) - Mike Hammer
Shoot-Out at Sugar Creek (2021) - A Caleb York story
Kill Me If You Can (2022) - Mike Hammer

Writing as Barbara Allan (with wife Barbara Collins): Trash 'n' Treasure series
Antiques Roadkill (August 2006)
Antiques Maul (August 2007)
Antiques Flee Market (September 2008)
Antiques Bizarre (March 2010)
Antiques Knock-Off (March 2011)
Antiques Disposal (May 2012)
Antiques Chop (May 2013)
Antiques Con (May 2014)
Antiques Swap (May 2015)
Antiques Fate (May 2016)

Other Barbara Allan books
Regeneration (1999)
Murder: His and Hers (2001)
Bombshell (2004)

Writing as Patrick Culhane
Black Hats (April 2007) – A novel featuring Wyatt Earp and Al Capone in 1920s New York
Red Sky in Morning (August 2008) – A historic mystery set in San Francisco during World War II, shortly after the attack on Pearl Harbor.

Miscellaneous
Midnight Haul (1986)
Mommy (1997)
Mommy's Day (1998)
Protect and Defend (1992)
Blue Christmas and other Holiday Homicides (2001) - short story collection
Tales of the Slayer (2002) - co-author, short story collection
My Lolita Complex (2006) - short story collection
Deadly Beloved - A Ms. Tree Novel (See Comics Section) (2007)
What Doesn't Kill Her (2013)
Early Crimes (2013)
Supreme Justice (2014)
Fate of the Union (2015)
Murderlized (2020) with Matthew V. Clemens, 11 short stories
Shoot the Moon (and More) (2021) unpublished crime novel (written in 1974) and two short stories
Reincarnal & Other Dark Tales (2021) stort stories
 The Many Lives of Jimmy Leighton (2021) with Dave Thomas

Comics

Aardvark-Vanaheim
 A-V in 3-D #1 (1984)
 Ms. Tree #10–18 (1984–1985)

AiT/Planet Lar
 Johnny Dynamite: Underworld #1 (2003)

Big Entertainment/Tekno Comix
 Mickey Spillane's Mike Danger #1–11 (1995–1996)
 Mickey Spillane's Mike Danger vol. 2 #1–10 (1996–1997)

Dark Horse Comics
 Harlan Ellison's Dream Corridor #1 (1995)
 Johnny Dynamite #1–4 (1994)

DC Comics
 Action Comics Weekly #601–609, 615–622, 636–641 (1988–1989)
 Batman #402–403, #408–412, Annual #11 (1986–1987)
 Batman: Child of Dreams (2003)
 Batman: Scar of the Bat #1 (1996)
 Ms. Tree Quarterly #1–8 (1990–1992)
 Ms. Tree Special #9–10 (1992–1993)
 On the Road to Perdition: Detour (2004)
 On the Road to Perdition: Oasis (2003)
 On the Road to Perdition: Sanctuary (2004)
 Road to Perdition (1998)
 Who's Who in the DC Universe #10 (1991)
 Wild Dog #1–4, Special #1 (1987–1989)
 Wild Times: Grifter #1 (1999)

Eclipse Comics
 Eclipse Magazine #1–6 (1981–1982)
 Ms. Tree #4–9 (1983–1984)
 Ms. Tree's Thrilling Detective Adventures #1–3 (1983)

First Comics
 Grimjack #11 (1985)
 P.I.'s: Michael Mauser and Ms. Tree #1–3 (1985)

IDW Publishing
 CSI: Crime Scene Investigation #1–5 (2003)
 CSI: Crime Scene Investigation - Bad Rap #1–5 (2003)
 CSI: Crime Scene Investigation: Demon House #1–5 (2004)
 CSI: NY - Bloody Murder #1–5 (2005)

Marvel Comics
 Captain America: Red, White & Blue HC (2002)

Renegade Press
 Ms. Tree #19–50 (1985–1989)
 Ms. Tree Summer Special #1 (1986)
 Ms. Tree's 1950's Three–Dimensional Crime #1 (1987)
 Ms. Tree 3-D #1 (1985)

Titan Comics
Quarry's War (2018)
Mickey Spillane's Mike Hammer: The Night I Died (2018)

References

External links

 
 The Max Allan Collins Papers are housed at the University of Iowa Special Collections & University Archives.
 
 
 
 BlogTalkRadio interview with Rodger Nichols (Feb. 2018)

1948 births
20th-century American novelists
21st-century American novelists
American comics writers
American male novelists
American mystery writers
Anthony Award winners
Writers of historical mysteries
Dick Tracy
Inkpot Award winners
Living people
Novelists from Iowa
People from Muscatine, Iowa
Shamus Award winners
University of Iowa alumni
20th-century American male writers
21st-century American male writers
20th-century pseudonymous writers
21st-century pseudonymous writers